The  2015 Saga gubernatorial election was held on 11 January 2015 to elect the Governor of Saga Prefecture. Newcomer Yoshinori Yamaguchi won the election.

Candidates
Yoshinori Yamaguchi – former Ministry of Internal Affairs and Communications civil servant, age 49
Keisuke Hiwatashi – former mayor of Takeo, Saga, age 45
 – professor at Kyushu University, age 59
 – farmer, age 44
Former Director of the Finance Bureau  was requested to run at the request of the LDP's Saga Prefecture branch, but declined.

Results

References

Saga gubernatorial elections
2015 elections in Japan